The 2009 Men's NORCECA Volleyball Championship was the 21st edition of the Men's Continental Volleyball Tournament, played from October 12 to October 17 at the Coliseo Rubén Rodríguez in Bayamón, Puerto Rico. The winner qualified for the 2009 FIVB Men's World Grand Champions Cup in Japan.

Teams

Squads

Preliminary round

Pool A

|}

|}

Pool B

|}

|}

Final round

Championship bracket

5th–8th places bracket

Quarterfinals

|}

5th–8th places

|}

Semifinals

|}

7th place

|}

5th place

|}

3rd place

|}

Final

|}

Final standing

Awards
MVP:  Wilfredo León
Best Scorer:  José Miguel Cáceres
Best Spiker:  Wilfredo León
Best Blocker:  Robertlandy Simón
Best Server:  Evan Patak
Best Digger:  Gregory Berrios
Best Setter:  Raydel Hierrezuelo
Best Receiver:   Gregory Berrios
Best Libero:  Gregory Berrios
Rising Star:  Wilfredo León
Jim Coleman Award:  Orlando Samuels

External links
Fixtures and results

Men's NORCECA Volleyball Championship
NORCECA Men
NORCECA Men
Volleyball